The 2013 Sabah state election was held on Sunday, 5 May 2013 concurrently with the 13th Malaysian general election. 60 state seats were contested to elect state legislature in the Malaysian state of Sabah. This was the 12th state election in Sabah. The state legislative assembly was dissolved on 3 April 2013 following the announcement by Najib Razak to dissolve the federal Parliament earlier on the same day. Sabahans will also elect 25 representatives to the federal legislature which will be covered as part of the general election.

The 2008 election was won by the Barisan Nasional (BN) coalition winning 59 out 60 seats. After the 2008 election, the Sabah Progressive Party (SAPP) withdrew from the BN coalition resulting in 2 state seats to move out of BN. As a result, the composition of parties in the state legislature prior to dissolution was BN with 57, SAPP with 2 and DAP with 1 seat.

The final results shown that BN will keep the assembly with 48 seats, a decrease of 11 seats. The newly formed Pakatan Rakyat won 11 seats, comparing to 1 in the last assembly. Sabah-based State Reform Party also won 1 seat via its leader Jeffrey Kitingan, while another Sabah-based party SAPP was wiped out from the assembly.

Contenders
BN was defending their previous victory and contested in all 60 state seats. out of the 60 seats, UMNO contested in 32, PBS in 13, UPKO in 6, LDP in 4 MCA in 2, GERAKAN in 2 and PBRS in 1. BN was challenged by the newly formed Pakatan Rakyat coalition consisting of PKR (43), DAP (8) and PAS (9). Other than Pakatan Rakyat, SAPP (41), STAR (47), BERSAMA (3) and KITA (1) also contested in the elections.

Parliamentary election results

There were 25 parliamentary or federal seats contested in Sabah. Barisan Nasional won 22 seats while DAP won 2 seats (Kota Kinabalu and Sandakan) and PKR won 1 (Penampang).

Results

Summary

Results for Barisan Nasional component parties

Result details

See also
 State Election Results of the 2013 Malaysian General Elections

References

2013
2013 elections in Malaysia